Becoming the Bull is the 4th track and first single on Atreyu's 4th album Lead Sails Paper Anchor. It is their second highest-charted single to date on Modern Rock Format (#5 on the Mainstream Rock Chart and #11 on the Modern Rock Chart), surpassing Ex's and Oh's. Additionally, the song was featured in the EA Sports American football video game Madden NFL 08, where it was incorrectly listed as being called "Becoming".

The band shot the video with acclaimed director Kevin Kerslake.
The video was released on MySpace Music on August 16, 2007.
It can also be found on YouTube.
The song itself was used to promote UFC commercials on Spike.

Background
The song has been released by Atreyu in a computer game where players have 20 sound clips and must put them in order in the fastest time. Atreyu made the game a contest where the contestant with the fastest time by August 6, 2007, would win a signed guitar, a phone call from the band, a copy of the CD before it was in stores, and a free membership to Atreyu's exclusive fan club. The top 10 runners-up were given a copy of the CD before it was in stores, and a free membership to Atreyu's exclusive fan club.

Atreyu has since made the single available on their MySpace page.

Track listing
 "Becoming the Bull"
 "Can't Happen Here (Demo)"

References

Atreyu (band) songs
Hollywood Records singles
2007 singles
2007 songs
Song recordings produced by John Feldmann